Eyiaba is a genus of beetles in the family Cerambycidae, containing the following species:

 Eyiaba itapetinga Galileo & Martins, 2004
 Eyiaba picta Galileo & Martins, 2004

References

Apomecynini
Cerambycidae genera